Liset Castillo Iglesias (born January 21, 1973 in Pinar del Río) is a retired female basketball player from Cuba. She twice competed for her native country at the Summer Olympics, finishing in fourth (1992) and in ninth place (2000) with the Women's National Team.

References

1973 births
Living people
Cuban women's basketball players
Basketball players at the 1992 Summer Olympics
Basketball players at the 2000 Summer Olympics
Olympic basketball players of Cuba
Basketball players at the 2003 Pan American Games
Pan American Games gold medalists for Cuba
Pan American Games medalists in basketball
Medalists at the 2003 Pan American Games
People from Pinar del Río